The New York/New Jersey Knights was a franchise in the World League of American Football for the 1991 and 1992 seasons. They played in the North American East division, which they won in the 1991 season. They were coached by Mouse Davis, an architect of the Run and shoot offense.

After 1992, the NFL (who backed the league) suspended the WLAF's operations. When the WLAF returned in the 1995 season the league was concentrated in Europe, and none of the seven North American teams (including New York/New Jersey Knights) returned.

They played their home games at Giants Stadium, also the former home to the NFL's New York Giants and New York Jets.

Season-by-season

1991 season

Personnel

Staff

Roster

Schedule/Results

1992 season

Personnel

Staff

Roster

Schedule/Results

References

NFL Europe (WLAF) teams
American football teams established in 1991
Sports clubs disestablished in 1992
Defunct American football teams in New Jersey
1991 establishments in New Jersey
1992 disestablishments in New Jersey